The Downtown Saskatoon bus terminal is a bus terminal for Saskatoon Transit in the Central Business District of Saskatoon, Saskatchewan. It is located on 23rd Street between 2nd Avenue and 3rd Avenue. There is a small customer service centre, where people can buy or re-load a Go-Pass smart card, or get info on Saskatoon Transit services.

Routes

The terminal is served by bus routes that include:
1 Exhibition/Wildwood
2 Meadowgreen
3 College Park/Hudson Bay Park
4 Mayfair/Willowgrove Square
5 Briarwood/McCormack
6 Market Mall/Broadway
7 Dundonald
8 8th Street
9 Riverside
10 Pleasant Hill
12 Airport/River Heights
14 North Industrial
17 Market Mall via Lorne/Hunter-Hartley
20 Confederation
22 University
50 Lakeview/Pacific Heights
60 Confederation/Lakeridge
70 Silverspring
80 Kenderdine
85 Silverwood
100 Downtown Direct

References

Transport in Saskatoon